Peter David Falconer (born 23 September 1943) is a former Australian politician. Born in Melbourne, he attended Monash University before becoming a management consultant. He served as Press Secretary to Senator Ivor Greenwood and as Secretary to federal Opposition Leader Billy Snedden before his own election to the Australian House of Representatives in 1975 as the Liberal member for Casey. He held the seat until his defeat in 1983.

References

Liberal Party of Australia members of the Parliament of Australia
Members of the Australian House of Representatives for Casey
Members of the Australian House of Representatives
1943 births
Living people
20th-century Australian politicians